Etapaka revenue division (or Etapaka division) is an administrative division in the East Godavari district of the Indian state of Andhra Pradesh. It is one of the 7 revenue divisions in the district which consists of 4 mandals under its administration. Etapaka is the divisional headquarters.

Administration 
There are 4 mandals in Etapaka revenue division, which were merged from Khammam district of Telangana into East Godavari district.

References 

Revenue divisions in East Godavari district